UWU or variants may refer to:

 uwu, also stylized as UwU, an emoticon indicating cuteness
 Uwu language, also known as the Ayere language
 United Workers Union, an Australian trade union
 Uva Wellassa University, in Sri Lanka